This is a list of Central Michigan Chippewas football players in the NFL Draft.

Key

Selections

References

Central Michigan

Central Michigan Chippewas in the NFL Draft